Lake Arthur Estates is a census-designated place and mobile home court located in Muddy Creek Township, Butler County, in the U.S. state of Pennsylvania. Located near the intersections of I-79 and US 422, the village is situated west of Lake Arthur, a reservoir on Muddy Creek. The community is also just west of Moraine State Park, which surrounds the lake.  As of the 2010 census the population was 594.

Demographics

References

External links

Census-designated places in Butler County, Pennsylvania
Census-designated places in Pennsylvania